Judeo-Tat literature is the literature of the Mountain Jews in the Juhuri language.

History

Judeo-Tat literature is rich in folklore. The most popular narrators of folklore at the beginning of the 20th century were Mardahai Ovsholum (1850-1925), Shaul Simandu (1856-1939), Khizgil Dadashev (1860-1945) and Aibolo of Tarki.

In 1904 Rabbi Yeshayahu Rabinovich was among the first to create literary works in the Juhuri language for a Judeo-Tat theatre group in the city of Derbent.

In the 1920s, theatre was the main form of Judeo-Tat literature. Playwrights who wrote for the first Mountain-Jewish amateur theatrical troupes include Yakov Agarunov (1907-1992), (Juhuri:Падшох, рабби ва ошир) - "Tsar, rabbi and the rich man", Herzl Gorsky (Ravvinovich) (1904 -1937?), (Juhuri:Бахар дас баба-дадай) - "The fruits of the hands of the father and mother", P. Shcherbatov, (Juhuri:Кук савдогар-революционер) - "The merchant's son is a revolutionary" and Yuno Semenov (1899-1961), who wrote plays (Juhuri:Амалданэ илчи) - "The wise matchmaker", 1924, (Juhuri:Дю алатфуруххо) - "Two junkies", 1924 and (Juhuri:Махсюм) - "Makhsum", 1927.

Since the appearance on June 3, 1928 in Derbent of a newspaper in the Judeo-Tat language Захметкеш - "The Toiler", whose editor-in-chief was Asail Binaev (1882-1958), one of the first mountain-Jewish professional literati; poems in the Judeo-Tat language began publishing regularly. All the mountain-Jewish poets of the 1920s - Ehil Matatov (1888-1943), Rachamim Ruvinov (1893-1955),  Yakov Agarunov, Boris Gavrilov (1908-1990), Neten Solomonov and Z. Nabinovich - were poets of Civic poetry. The theme of women's equality recurs throughout poetry of Yakov Agarunov (Juhuri:Духдар доги) - "Mountain Girl", 1928, Iskhog Khanukhov (1903-1973) (Juhuri:Джофокашэ дадай) - "Mother-toiler" and (Juhuri:Ай зан Мизрах) - "About the Woman of the East", both were written in 1928, a series of poems were written by Ehil Matatov (1888-1943) and Boris Gavrilov.

By the end of the 20th century have started the formation and development of the Mountain-Jewish artistic prose. One of its founders was Yuno Semenov. His biggest story was (Juhuri:Ошнахой ан раби Хасдил) - "Familiar people of Rabbi Hasdil", 1928-29. 

In the early 1930s was formed a Mountain Jewish literary circle in Moscow, headed by I. Ben-Ami (Benyaminov) (? - 1937?). The poet, playwright and prose writer Mishi Bakhshiev (1910-1972), poets Manuvakh Dadashev (1913-1943)  and Daniel Atnilov (1913-1968), the first professional literary translator Zovolun Bakhshiev (1896-1968) and others quickly took the leading place in the Judeo-Tat literature. In the mid-1930s, this literary circle in Moscow stopped to function.

From the end of 1934 until the termination of publishing and cultural activities in the Judeo-Tat language in Azerbaijan in 1938, a circle of the Judeo-Tat literature existed in Baku under the newspaper Kommunist (editor-in-chief Yakov Agarunov) and the Mountain-Jewish department of the Azerbaijan State Publishing House, which was headed by Yakov Agarunov and Yuno Semenov.

In 1932, a poet Mishi Bakhshiev wrote his first book - "Komsomol", the main theme was of the social disintegration of the Mountain Jews.
Other his work theme were about the involvement of a Mountain-Jewish woman to Soviet reality (Juhuri:Ма‘ни духдару) - "Song of a Girl", 1933, (Juhuri:Рапорт) - "Report", 1933 and (Juhuri:Хумор) - "Gamble", 1933-34. 
In the second half of the 1930s the playwright Mishi Bakhshiev wrote a play (Juhuri:Бесгуни игидхо) - "Victory of the Heroes", 1936, about the civil war in Dagestan. It was the first heroic drama in the Judeo-Tat language. Later Mishi Bakhshiev wrote (Juhuri:Хори) - "Earth", 1939 and in 1940, he created a play in verse for folklore motifs: (Juhuri:Шох угли, шох Аббас ва хомбол Хасан) - "Shah's son, Shah Abbas and loader Hasan". The second, his biggest story was (Juhuri:Ватагачихо) - ("Fishermen", 1933, about the life of the Mountain Jewish fishermen from Derbent.

A poet Dubiya Bakhshiev (1914-1993) in his poem (Juhuri:Занхо а колхоз) - "Woman in the collective farm", 1933, combines the theme of women with the theme of the creation of the Mountain-Jewish collective farms.

In the dramaturgy of the 1930s, a significant role continues to play Yuno Semenov who wrote his drama (Juhuri:Дю бирор) - "Two brothers". 

In the late 1930s novelist, poet and playwright Hizgil Avshalumov published a large story (Juhuri:Басгуни джовонхо) - "The Victory of the Young", 1940, it appeared with essays and feuilletons. Avshalumov dedicated a number of his works to the modern hero of the Mountain Jewish’s village (Juhuri:Маслахат на хингар) - "Council and Khinkal", (Juhuri:Аджал занхо) - "Death to wives", (Juhuri:Шюваран дю хову) - "Bigamist”, essays about the Hero of Socialist Labour Gyulboor Davydov (1892-1983) and Solomon (Shelmun) Rabaev (1916-1963) and others. The story (Juhuri:Занбирор) - "Sister-in-law" is about the life of the Mountain Jews social elite in Derbent on the eve and during the revolution and in the first years of Soviet Union power. In his novel (Juhuri:Кук гудил) - "The son of the mummer", 1974, Avshalumov gave the detailed description of the Mountain Jew farmer and his centuries old traditional way of life. Later, Hizgil Avshalumov created a folklore image of the witty (Juhuri:Шими Дербенди) - Shimi from Derbent (Mountain Jewish analogue of Hershel of Ostropol)  

The Great Purge of 1936-38 caused a cruel blow to the Judeo-Tat literature.
Herzl Gorsky (Ravvinovich), Ekhil Matatov, I. Ben-Ami (Benyaminov, I.) and Asail Binaev were arrested. With the exception of Asail Binaev they all have died in the Soviet Union prisons and camps.

During the World War II years of the Soviet Union with Germany (1941-45), most figures of the Judeo-Tat literature were drafted into the army. Poet Manuvakh Dadashev was killed at war. During the four years of the war, not a single literary and artistic book in the Judeo-Tat language was published.

In 1940s the authorities closed in Derbent the Mounted Jewish newspaper (Juhuri:Захметкеш) - "The Toiler".
From 1946 to the end of 1953 the Judeo-Tat literature existed only implicitly. All these years the Mountain-Jewish section of the writers' organization did not function, and the creative issues of the Judeo-Tat literature disappeared from the agenda of the Dagestan Writers' Union. Only at the end of 1953 the publication of a small collection of poems by Daniil Atnilov (Juhuri:Чихрат вахд) - "The Image of Time" renewed the functioning of the Judeo-Tat literature as one of the literatures of Dagestan. 

Since 1955 began to appear in the Judeo-Tat language almanac (Juhuri:Ватан советиму) - "The Soviet Homeland". In 1946, in Dagestan, the circle of readers of the Jewish-Tat literature is constantly narrowing due to the termination of school education in the Jewish-Tat language. 

Since the 1950s, prose has been predominant in the Judeo-Tat literature. The leading role in it belongs to Misha Bakhshiyev and Hizgil Avshalumov. Mishi Bakhshiyev originally published his works in Russian ("Stories about My Countrymen", 1956, a collection of essays and short stories "Simple People", 1958 and "Noisy gardens", 1962). In these books, the author spoke not so much specifically as the Mountain-Jewish, but as a general Dagestan writer. In 1963 Mishi Bakhshiyev published a novel (Juhuri:Хушахой онгур) - "Bunches of grapes". 

The Judeo-Tat children writer in the post-Stalin period was Amaldan (Amal) Kukullu (1935-2000). He released a collection of stories (Juhuri:Синемиши) - "Testing", 1968, and others.

Poetry in the Jewish-Tat literature of the 1950s-70s was mostly from achievements of the 1930s. Most prolific and famous poet of that period was Daniil Atnilov. Permanently living in Moscow, in isolation from the everyday elements of the Mountain-Tat language. His collection (Juhuri:Гюлхой инсони) - "The Color of Mankind", 1971 was published posthumously that summarized his work of the 1950-60s. 

A number of poets of the 20th century created their works in the Juhuri language, such as Sergey Izgiyayev, created poems and plays: (Juhuri:Иму гъэлхэнд шолуминим) - We are the defenders of the World (1952), (Juhuri:Фикиргьой шогьир) - Thoughts of the Poet (1966), (Juhuri:Муьгьбет ве гьисмет) - The fate and love (1972) and a number of other works. Shimshun Safonov, in 1968, created a collection of poetry (Juhuri:Парза, ма‘ни ма) - "Fly, my verse".
 Poetess Zoya Semenduev released a collection (Juhuri:Войгей дуьл) - "The Command of the Heart". In 2007, published the book (Juhuri: Духдер эн дуь бебе) "Daughter of two fathers", which includes the play of the same name and fairy tales.

At the end of the 20th century, a number of the Mountain Jewish writers wrote only in Russian, such as the poet Lazar Amirov (1936-2007), novelist Felix Bakhshiev (1937), literary critic and novelist Manashir Azizov (1936-2011), and Asaf Mushailov. Asaf Mushailov, in 2017 published the book "Poems Poems Stories".

Literature

 Agarunov Ya.M., Tat (Jewish) - Russian dictionary. M., 1997.
 Anisimov I.Sh., Caucasian Jews - Highlanders. - M .: "Science", 2002.
 Anisimov I.Sh., Caucasian Jews - Highlanders, newspaper. "Rassvet", No 18. - SPb., April 30, 1881.
 Berg., Caucasian Jews, Caucasus, # 250, 1895.
 Garkavi, A. Ja. (1874). Skazaniia evreiskikh pisatelei o khazarskom tsarstve (Accounts by Jewish writers of the Khazar empire). St. Petersburg.
 Grunberg A.L. The language of the North Azerbaijani Tats. L., 1963.
 Grunberg A. L., Davydova L. Kh. Tat language, in the book: Fundamentals of Iranian linguistics. New Iranian languages: Western group, Caspian languages. M., 1982.
 Kurdov, K. M. (1907). Gorskie evrei Dagestana (Mountain Jews of Daghestan). Moscow.
 Hebrew languages and dialects // Brief Jewish Encyclopedia - Jerusalem: Society for the Study of Jewish Communities, 1982. - Volume 2, columns 417.
 Miller V.F. Materials for studying the Judeo-Tat language. SPb., 1892.
 Miller V.F. Essays on the morphology of the Hebrew-Tat dialect. SPb., 1892.

Mountain Jewish authors

Daniil Atnilov (1913–1968)
Hizgil Avshalumov (1913–2001)
Mishi Bakhshiev (1910–1972)
Manuvakh Dadashev (1913–1943)
Boris Gavrilov (1908–1990)
Mikhail Gavrilov (1926–2014)
Sergey Izgiyayev (1922–1972)
Yakov Agarunov (1907–1992)
Yuno Semyonov (1899–1961)
Zoya Semenduyeva (1929–2020)

References

External links

Mountain Jews
The Mountain Jews
Mountain Jews

 
Russian literature
Azerbaijani literature
Jewish literature
Literature by language
Lists of writers by language

az:Dağ yəhudiləri ədəbiyyatı
es:Literatura juhuri
fr:Littérature juhuri 
he:ספרות ג'וחורי
it:Letteratura giudeo-tat
ja:ユダヤ・タート語文学 
pt:Literatura tat-judeu
tr:Churi edebiyatı 
zh:猶太-塔特語文學